Troy Matthew Mallette (born February 25, 1970) is a Canadian former professional ice hockey player. Mallette played in the National Hockey League for the New York Rangers, Edmonton Oilers, New Jersey Devils, Ottawa Senators, Boston Bruins and the Tampa Bay Lightning.

Playing career
Mallette was drafted 22nd overall by the Rangers in the 1988 NHL Entry Draft and played 456 regular season games in his professional career, scoring 51 goals and 68 assists for 119 points and collecting 1226 penalty minutes.  While playing for Tampa Bay, he suffered a back injury against the Chicago Blackhawks on October 25, 1997, that eventually forced him to retire.

Personal life
Troy currently lives in Onaping Falls, Ontario. He is married to Lynn Mallette with two children, Trent and Tory. He is currently a firefighter with the Greater Sudbury Fire Department.

Career statistics

Regular season and playoffs

External links

1970 births
Living people
Boston Bruins players
Canadian ice hockey forwards
Edmonton Oilers players
New Jersey Devils players
New York Rangers draft picks
New York Rangers players
Ottawa Senators players
Ice hockey people from Ontario
Sportspeople from Greater Sudbury
Prince Edward Island Senators players
Sault Ste. Marie Greyhounds players
Tampa Bay Lightning players
Utica Devils players